Todisoa Franck Rabearison (born 3 February 1992) is a Madagascan Olympic athlete.

He won the gold medal at the 2019 Indian Ocean Island Games in the 400 metres. He competed at the Athletics at the 2020 Summer Olympics – Men's 400 metres running a seasons best 48.40 but did not qualify from his heat.

References

External links
 

1992 births
Living people
Malagasy male sprinters
Olympic athletes of Madagascar
Athletes (track and field) at the 2020 Summer Olympics